Božidar "Boža" Munćan was a Serbian basketball player and coach. He represented the Yugoslavia national basketball team internationally.

Playing career 
Munćan played for Belgrade-based teams Yugoslav Army and Partizan of the Yugoslav First League. During the 1945 season with Yugoslav Army, he won the National Championships.

National team career
Munćan was a member of the Yugoslavia national team which participated at the 1947 FIBA European Championship in Prague, Czechoslovakia. Over two tournament games, he averaged 1.0 point per game.

Coaching career 
Munćan coached Partizan for two seasons in the Yugoslav First League where he compiled a 21–15 record.

Career achievements and awards 
 Yugoslav League champion: 1 (with Yugoslav Army: 1945).

Coaching record

Yugoslav First Men's Basketball League

See also 
List of KK Partizan head coaches

References

1925 births
1990 deaths
Guards (basketball)
KK BASK players
KK Partizan players
KK Partizan coaches
Serbian men's basketball players
Serbian men's basketball coaches
Yugoslav men's basketball players
Yugoslav basketball coaches
1942 Belgrade Basketball Championship players
Date of death missing
Place of birth missing
Place of death missing